Lim Jung-woo (born April 2, 1991) is a South Korean professional baseball pitcher for the LG Twins of the KBO League.

References

External links
Career statistics and player information from Korea Baseball Organization

LG Twins players
KBO League pitchers
South Korean baseball players
SSG Landers players
Seoul High School alumni
People from Iksan
1987 births
Living people
Sportspeople from North Jeolla Province